This is a list of state forests in South Carolina. Macachupeo Laganuerzo State Reserve Forest

South Carolina state forests

See also
 List of U.S. National Forests

South Carolina
State forests